is a Japanese light novel series written by Yukiya Murasaki and illustrated by Takahiro Tsurusaki. The light novels are published in English by J-Novel Club. A manga adaptation by Naoto Fukuda has been running since 2015, and is licensed by Seven Seas Entertainment. An anime television series adaptation by Ajia-do Animation Works aired from July 5 to September 20, 2018. A second season by Tezuka Productions and Okuruto Noboru aired from April 9 to June 11, 2021.

Plot
Takuma Sakamoto is a hikikomori gamer who is mysteriously transported to the virtual world of his favourite MMORPG, Cross Reverie, with the appearance of his own character in the game, the Demon Lord Diablo. The two young girls who summoned him, the pantherian Rem and the elf Shera, attempt to use a spell to make Takuma their servant, but due to his magic ring with the ability "Magic Reflection", the spell rebounds, and both end up with magic collars stuck on their necks, thus becoming his servants instead. With a serious case of social anxiety, Takuma decides to act like his character while interacting with others, and makes use of his high stats and vast knowledge of Cross Reveries lore to survive in his new environment, traveling along with Rem and Shera to look for a way to remove their slave collars, while helping them with their own personal issues that led them to summon him in the first place.

Characters
 / 

Takuma was a Cross Reverie player who controlled the character @Diablo-13, known as the true Demon Lord. He always defeated players with better equipment and overwhelming skills, always holding back for being too strong. But one day he was invoked into another world, appearing in the body of his character, Diablo, finding two girls, a Pantherian and an elf, who claimed to have summoned him and that he should be a slave to one of them, but due to his ring's ability, the magic has rebound back against them, becoming his slaves. Takuma has poor social skills, resulting in him speaking as his character to communicate; it comes off idiotic (to readers) since he doesn't grow out of this, despite the fact it causes more problems than necessary.

Shera L. Greenwood is an Elf who is one of the two Summoners who summoned Diablo. Unfortunately, she is also a moron; adding to the problems Diablo has to fix. The reason she summoned him was to have the strength to live free. She is 15. Her name is pronounced like      "She-Ra".

Rem Galleu is a Pantherian who became a summoner and had no choice but to become an adventurer and continue to demonstrate its strength, saying to aim to exterminate the Demon King Krebskulm. Rem typically has to deal with reeling in Shera. It is later revealed that the soul of Krebskulm is sealed in her body and in case she dies the soul will be released. She is 14.

Alicia Crystella is an Imperial Knight. She was born as a daughter of a duke house. She is a demon lord worshiper, whose mind is seriously damaged after seeing the depravity of mankind.

Sylvie is the Guildmaster of the Adventurer's Guild in Faltra City.

Edelgard is a Fallen (Demonic Being). She is shown riding a dragon-like creature, but as she enters into combat she descends from him and fights swiftly with her spear, this is because her demonic beast was paralyzed out of fear. She commanded the army that attacked the city of Faltra and was the superior of Gregore, but was defeated with the rest of the demonic beings by the supreme magic of Diablo.

 Celestine Baudelaire is the head of the Mage Association in the city of Faltra. She is thus responsible of the magical barrier around the city. Before Diablo's summoning, she was the only one in confidence of Rem's secret and she keeps a close eye on her.

Krebskulm is the ruler of the Fallen (Demonic Beings) who suffers from amnesia. She has a fondness for biscuits. She later turns into her true form after Rem was attacked.

 Mei is a maid and the manager of the "Peace of the Mind" inn where the protagonists reside.

 Emile is a warrior responsible of evaluating the level of warriors in the Adventurer's Guild in Faltra. He is self-proclaimed “ally to all women”.

 The perverted brother of Shera L. Greenwood. He wishes to make Shera into his wife to produce a pure-blooded child.

 The governor of the city of Faltra and a veteran of the fallen-human war which took place 30 years before the story occurs.

 A slave trader who happens to be a acquaintance of Celestine Baudelaire with whom she shared the same magical instructor.

 Saddler is a Paladin with a God complex and sadistic tendencies.

A High Priestess who fled from the church who ordered her death, she is rescued by Diablo and since then views him as a god, despite his attempts to deny it. She is later escorted by Diablo and his party to Zircon Tower City.

A magic automaton maid who was a originally prototype AI powered NPC that Takuma claimed and assigned to watch over the dungeon created by him. In his shut in days Takuma usually would talk about his feelings to her and due to her AI functions was able to respond as she saw fit.  She is materialized in the living world of Cross Reverie along the dungeon and later reunites with Diablo, becoming his most loyal servant.

She is 12. She is a Grasswalker who became a adventurer, she became a part timer for Diablo's party but took temporary leave to study magic.  

The main antagonist of Season 2, he was the corrupt Head Cardinal of the Church of Lyferia. 

|Monica Rial}}

Media

Light novels

The light novels are written by Yukiya Murasaki and illustrated by Takahiro Tsurusaki. Kodansha published the first volume under their Ranobe Bunko imprint in December 2014. J-Novel Club announced on September 28, 2017, that they had licensed the series for the North American market.

Manga

Naoto Fukuda launched a manga adaptation of the series on Kodansha's Niconico based manga service Suiyōbi no Sirius in June 2015. Seven Seas Entertainment announced their license to the manga on September 14, 2017.

Anime
An anime television series adaptation was announced in January 2018. The series was directed by Yūta Murano and written by Kazuyuki Fudeyasu, with animation by studio Ajia-do Animation Works. Character designs for the series were provided by Shizue Kaneko. Yuki Nishioka was the chief animation director. Yuki Miyamoto provided monster designs and serves as action animation director. Backgrounds were provided by Kusanagi, while Natsuko Otsuka was the color key artist. Photography for the series was directed by Teppei Satō at Asahi Production Shiraishi Studio, and Satoshi Motoyama directed the sound at Half HP Studio. The series aired from July 5 to September 20, 2018, and was broadcast on AT-X, BS Fuji, Tokyo MX, and Sun TV. The series' opening theme, "DeCIDE", was performed by the unit SUMMONERS 2+, a group composed of voice actresses Azumi Waki, Yū Serizawa, Yumi Hara, Rumi Okubo, and Emiri Katō, while the ending theme, was performed by Serizawa and produced by HoneyWorks. The first season ran for 12 episodes.

Crunchyroll simulcast the series worldwide outside of Asia, while Funimation streamed a SimulDub of it in North America. Following Sony's acquisition of Crunchyroll, the English dub was moved to Crunchyroll. In South and Southeast Asia, Medialink licensed the series.

On April 8, 2020, it was announced that the series would receive a second season titled How Not to Summon a Demon Lord Ω, co-animated by Tezuka Productions and Okuruto Noboru, and directed by Satoshi Kuwabara, with the rest of the staff and cast members reprising their roles. The second season aired on TBS and BS-TBS from April 9 to June 11, 2021.  The second season's opening theme, "EVERYBODY! EVERYBODY!", and ending theme, "YOU YOU YOU," were performed by Serizawa with collaboration by DJ KOO & MOTSU. The second season ran for 10 episodes.

Season 1

Season 2

Reception
The How Not to Summon a Demon Lord light novels had over 1 million copies in print as of March 2018. The anime adaptation was the 7th most viewed anime of 2019 on Crunchyroll. On January 4, 2023, the Australian Classification Board refused classification for How Not to Summon a Demon Lord Ω but did not provide a reason. The decision means that the second season of the anime "cannot be sold, hired, advertised or legally imported in Australia", although it is still available for streaming.

Notes

References

External links
  
  
  
 Anime official Twitter 
 

2018 anime television series debuts
2021 anime television series debuts
2014 Japanese novels
Ajia-do Animation Works
Anime and manga based on light novels
AT-X (TV network) original programming
Comedy anime and manga
Crunchyroll anime
Demon novels
Harem anime and manga
Isekai anime and manga
Isekai novels and light novels
J-Novel Club books
Japanese comedy novels
Japanese fantasy novels
Kodansha books
Kodansha manga
Kodansha Ranobe Bunko
Light novels
Medialink
Okuruto Noboru
Seven Seas Entertainment titles
Shōnen manga
Tezuka Productions
Censorship in Australia